The Clean Air Campaign is a not-for-profit organization that motivates Georgians to take action to improve air quality and reduce traffic congestion. The organization was formed in 1996 by government, business, civic, health, environmental and educational organizations to address traffic congestion and air quality issues in the metro Atlanta region.

Until 2014, The Clean Air Campaign received 80 percent of its funding from U.S. Department of Transportation Congestion Mitigation and Air Quality Improvement (CMAQ) Program funds. Today, The Clean Air Campaign secures private funding through corporate and foundation grants to deploy demand management programs and services to employers, commuters and schools.

Public education 

The Clean Air Campaign was formed in 1996 following an initiative by Atlanta business, civic, environmental and political leaders which led to less traffic and air pollution during the 1996 Olympics. The non-profit organization, which celebrated its 15th anniversary in the summer of 2011, fulfills its education efforts today through mass advertising, public relations and community outreach. Their education efforts are part of a statewide strategic approach to improve mobility and air quality, bringing public and private sector interests together.

Employer rewards programs 

The Clean Air Campaign works with employers in the region, given that high concentrations of employees commuting to a common destination during peak travel periods are a high-value audience for their programs. According to a 2010 survey conducted by the Center for Transportation and the Environment on behalf of the Georgia Department of Transportation, 82 percent of metro Atlanta commuters drive alone to and from work. .  The greater means and resources of employers versus individual commuters opens up a broader range of solutions to their commute issues.

Employer partnership program
The Clean Air Campaign's principal method of engaging employers is through their general Employer Partnership Program.  Campaign experts design a commute alternative program tailored to the specific needs of the employer based on workforce size, operating hours, office access to public transit and an array of other factors.

Campaign staff are then able to assist the employer with employee outreach through programs such as onsite "transportation fairs," educational sessions and assistance in taking advantage of available alternative commute incentives.

Alternative work arrangement consulting
The Clean Air Campaign develops alternative work arrangements typically to augment an alternative commute program.  Telework, compressed work weeks and flextime are all viable options employed to reduce the number of instances in which employees must commute to work during peak traffic hours or inclement weather conditions.  This element of The Clean Air Campaign's program is unique in that it aims to assist with business continuity planning as much as transportation demand management and air pollution mitigation.  This program has also proved critical to employers whose workforces are affected by Atlanta's frequent road and highway closures.

As one of the leading American cities when it comes to wireless and broadband internet access, the Atlanta metro area stands to benefit economically from the expanded adoption of telework. Based on 2010 survey data, 600,000 metro Atlanta employees telework occasionally and another 245,000 employees do not have permission from their employer to telework but believe their job function would allow it.    Clean Air Campaign has lobbied to keep Georgia's telework tax credit in place, as well as assists businesses in taking advantage of these available funds.

The One Ton Challenge

The One Ton Challenge is a statewide effort to encourage commuters to use a commute alternative.  By tying a measurable and easily understandable amount of impact on the environment (one ton of atmospheric pollutants conserved) to a clear and consistent call to action (one alternative commute to work per week) this challenge attempts to provide a more tangible, less abstract illustration of the environmental benefits provided by alternative commute options.

The challenge derives from the fact that an individual commuter in metro Atlanta is capable of eliminating a full ton of atmospheric pollutants simply by using an alternative commuting method once per week. The average round-trip commute distance in Atlanta is 40 miles. It is estimated that one pound of atmospheric pollution is emitted per mile driven in a conventional vehicle.  By eliminating one commute per week, or roughly 52 commutes per year, the average Atlantan would keep 2,080 lbs., or slightly over one ton, of pollution out of the air.

Over 3,600 commuters participated in the challenge in 2008, the program's first year.

Clean Air Schools program

In 2004, The Clean Air Campaign introduced Clean Air Schools, an education outreach program that engages the entire school community in improving air quality. Initially offered to a select group of elementary schools in the 20-county metro Atlanta region, the program was expanded in 2008 to include middle and high schools statewide and the name changed to Clean Air Schools.

Today, the Clean Air Schools program focuses on two teen-targeted programs: Get There Green, a high school transportation planning challenge, and OnAir, a clean air site (www.blogonair.org) and social media initiative that rewards teens with 'AirCreds' for taking clean transportation modes and completing other air-friendly tasks.

References

External links 
The Clean Air Campaign

Environment of the United States
Environmental organizations based in Georgia (U.S. state)
Health campaigns